Libenice is a municipality and village in Kolín District in the Central Bohemian Region of the Czech Republic. It has about 300 inhabitants.

Etymology
The name is derived from the personal name Ljuben, who was probably a local nobleman. The original name of the village was Ljubenice.

Geography
It lies in a flat agricultural landscape of the Central Elbe Table. The Hořanský Stream flows through the municipality.

History

Archaeological finds show that the area was populated by Celts during the Hallstatt and La Tène periods. At the Celtic settlement site between Libenice and Kaňk (a part of Kutná Hora), numerous ceramic finds from the 5th–1st century BC were discovered in 1981. In 1959, an elongated area north of the village was discovered with the grave of a 50-year-old woman buried with plenty of bronze jewelry and a two-metre long stone stele made of yellowish and ocher-colored mica migmatite with tourmaline, which probably indicates a Celtic sanctuary; recent findings in archeology tend to point to a rectangular earthwork. In 1993 roughly ten graves from the Celtic period were found near this site by grave robbers.

The first written mention of Libenice is from 1142 as the possession of the Cistercian Sedlec Abbey. In 1396, the monastery sold the Libenice manor to King Wenceslaus IV of Bohemia. The local fortress was built in 1401 at the latest. In 1422, King Sigismund pledged the property to Erkinger of Seinsheim. The subsequent pawn owners of the Libenice manor were Hanuš of Rychnov from 1437, and Hynek and Pavel of Zaloňov from 1440 to 1454.

In 1498 King Vladislaus II of Hungary mortgaged Libenice to Bohuš Kostka of Postupice, then the village often changed owners, who were mostly lower aristocrats. From 1540 to 1589, it was owned by the Libenický of Vrchoviště family. In 1593, Emperor Rudolf II acquired Libenice and joined it to the Kolín estate. Apart from 1611 to 1616, Libenice remained part of the Kolín estate until the abolition of the patrimonial administration in 1848. In 1778, the Libenice yard was abolished and parceled out.

In 1801, a public school was opened in Libenice. It was closed in 1965. From 1862, there was also a private Protestant school, but it was closed in 1921 due to insufficient number of students.

After the abolition of patrimonial rule, Libenice, together with Grunta, formed a municipality in the Kolín District. On 1 January 1992, Grunta separated from Libenice and formed a sovereign municipality.

Demographics

Transport

The state road I/38 from Kutná Hora to Kolín runs north of the village.

Sights
The most valuable building is the remnant of a Renaissance fortress. The fortress from the end of the 14th century was rebuilt by Jan Libenický of Vrchoviště in 1574. The fortress burned down in 1643. The three-winged building was then reconstructed and used as an outbuilding.

The Evangelical church was built on the western outskirts in 1826–1827. Near the church is the evangelical cemetery with Libenice Oak.

There is a menhir in the village common that is a replica of the stele found in the archeological site. It was created by local artist at the end of the 20th century.

References

External links

Villages in Kolín District